In baseball, a perfect game is a game in which one or more pitchers complete a minimum of nine innings with no batter from the opposing team reaching any base. To achieve a perfect game, a team must not allow any opposing player to reach base by any means: no hits, walks, hit batsmen, uncaught third strikes, catcher's or fielder's interference, or fielding errors; in short, "27 up, 27 down" (for a nine-inning game).

A perfect game, by definition, is also a no-hitter, a win, and a shutout. A fielding error that does not allow a batter to reach base, such as a misplayed foul ball, does not spoil a perfect game. Games that last fewer than nine innings, regardless of cause, in which a team has no baserunners do not qualify as perfect games. Games in which a team reaches first base only in extra innings also do not qualify as perfect games.

In Major League Baseball (MLB), the feat has been achieved 23 times – 21 times since the modern era began in 1901, most recently by Félix Hernández of the Seattle Mariners on August 15, 2012. Although it is possible for several pitchers to combine for a perfect game (which has happened 19 times in MLB no-hitters), every MLB perfect game so far has been thrown by a single pitcher. Nippon Professional Baseball's 2007 Japan Series ended with a combined perfect game.

History

The first known occurrence of the term perfect game in print was in 1908. I. E. Sanborn's report for the Chicago Tribune about Addie Joss's performance against the White Sox calls it "an absolutely perfect game, without run, without hit, and without letting an opponent reach first base by hook or crook, on hit, walk, or error, in nine innings". Several sources have claimed that the first recorded usage of perfect game was by Ernest J. Lanigan in his Baseball Cyclopedia, made in reference to Charlie Robertson's 1922 perfect game. The Chicago Tribune came close to the term in describing Lee Richmond's game for Worcester in 1880: "Richmond was most effectively supported, every position on the home nine being played to perfection." Similarly, in writing up John Montgomery Ward's 1880 perfect game, the New York Clipper described the "perfect play" of Providence's defense.

There has been one perfect game in the World Series, thrown by Don Larsen for the New York Yankees against the Brooklyn Dodgers on October 8, 1956. By coincidence, Larsen was in attendance when Yankee pitcher David Cone threw a perfect game in 1999 on the same day that Larsen and Yogi Berra (the catcher in the 1956 perfect game) were invited to do the ceremonial first pitch.

Ron Hassey is the only catcher in MLB history to have caught more than one perfect game (his first was with pitcher Len Barker in 1981 and his second was with pitcher Dennis Martínez in 1991).

The most recent perfect game for MLB was on August 15, 2012, Félix Hernández of the Seattle Mariners against the Tampa Bay Rays. He struck out the side twice and struck out twelve total batters in a 1–0 victory.

Rule definition by MLB
As of 2021, the Major League Baseball definition of a perfect game is largely a side effect of the decision made by the major leagues' Committee for Statistical Accuracy on September 4, 1991, to redefine a no-hitter as a game in which the pitcher or pitchers on one team throw a complete game of nine innings or more without surrendering a hit. That decision removed a number of games that had long appeared in the record books: those lasting fewer than nine innings, and those in which a team went hitless in regulation but then got a hit in extra innings. The definition of perfect game was made to parallel this new definition of the no-hitter, in effect substituting "baserunner" for "hit". As a result of the 1991 redefinition, for instance, Harvey Haddix does not receive credit for a perfect game or a no-hitter for his performance on May 26, 1959, when he threw 12 perfect innings against the Milwaukee Braves before a batter reached in the 13th.

A rule change in effect for the 2020 through 2022 seasons awarded the offensive team a free runner on second base each half-inning during extra innings. This rule opened the possibility of a team scoring a run (batting in the free baserunner on a sacrifice fly, for example) without any player ever reaching first base. This would still have been recorded as a perfect game according to MLB's official record-keeper, the Elias Sports Bureau, since an automatic runner is not a batter who reached base safely.
Another rule change effective for the same two seasons stipulated that games that are part of doubleheaders last only seven innings. Such a game in which one team did not reach first base would not have been credited as a perfect game (similar to weather-shortened games). However, if such a doubleheader game were to have at least two extra innings and one team still did not reach first base, then the game would have been credited as a perfect game. During those two seasons, no potential perfect games were affected. Both rule changes were expected to be reversed prior to the 2022 season; however, the extra innings rule did return while doubleheaders reverted to a full nine-inning length.

In other leagues

In Nippon Professional Baseball (NPB), the first perfect game was thrown by Hideo Fujimoto of the Giants on June 28, 1950, against the Nishi Nippon Pirates.

The most recent perfect game for NPB was thrown by Chiba Lotte Marines pitcher Rōki Sasaki on April 10, 2022. Sasaki tied an existing NPB record by striking out 19 batters, and set a new record by striking out 13 consecutive batters. Sasaki compiled a game score of 106, surpassing the 105 for Kerry Wood's 20 strikeout game from the 1998 Major League Baseball season, which was the highest MLB game score since the end of the baseball color line.

On April 11, 2021, University of North Texas softball pitcher Hope Trautwein threw a perfect game, facing 21 batters and striking out all 21. It was the first seven-inning perfect game with every out being a strikeout in NCAA Division I history.

The only perfect game thrown in a Little League World Series championship was by Ángel Macías of the Monterrey, Mexico, team in 1957.

Four Puerto Rico pitchers combined for an 8-inning perfect game against Israel in the 2023 World Baseball Classic. Starter José De León recorded ten strikeouts in 5 2/3 innings, and three relievers recorded the remaining outs before the game ended early because of the mercy rule. It was ruled to not be a perfect game by the Elias Sports Bureau as they stipulate that a perfect game must last at least 9 innings. Puerto Rico international José De León stated at the time that "It's perfect for us".

See also

 Harvey Haddix's near-perfect game
 Armando Galarraga's near-perfect game
 Eight-ender in curling
 Golden set in tennis
 Maximum break in snooker
 Nine-dart finish in darts
 Perfect game in bowling

Notes

Sources

Alvarez, Mark, ed. (1993). The Perfect Game: A Classic Collection of Facts, Figures, Stories and Characters from the Society for American Baseball Research (Taylor). 
Anderson, David W. (2000). More Than Merkle: A History of the Best and Most Exciting Baseball Season in Human History (Lincoln and London: University of Nebraska Press). 
Browning, Reed (2003). Cy Young: A Baseball Life (Amherst: University of Massachusetts Press). 
Buckley Jr., James (2002). Perfect: The Inside Story of Baseball's Seventeen Perfect Games (Triumph Books). 
Chen, Albert (2009). "The Greatest Game Ever Pitched", Sports Illustrated (June 1; available online).
Coffey, Michael (2004). 27 Men Out: Baseball's Perfect Games (New York: Atria Books). 
Cook, William A. (2004). Waite Hoyt: A Biography of the Yankees' Schoolboy Wonder (Jefferson, N.C.: McFarland). 
Deutsch, Jordan A. et al. (1975). The Scrapbook History of Baseball (New York: Bobbs-Merrill). 
Deveaux, Tom (2001). The Washington Senators, 1901–1971 (Jefferson, N.C.: McFarland). 
Dewey, Donald, and Nicholas Acocella (1995). The Biographical History of Baseball (New York: Carroll & Graf). 
Dickson, Paul (2009). The Dickson Baseball Dictionary, 3d ed. (New York: W. W. Norton). 
Egan, James M. (2008). Base Ball on the Western Reserve: The Early Game in Cleveland and Northeast Ohio, Year by Year and Town by Town, 1865–1900 (Jefferson, N.C.: McFarland). 
Elston, Gene (2006). A Stitch in Time: A Baseball Chronology, 3d ed. (Houston, Tex.: Halcyon Press). 
Fleitz, David L. (2004). Ghosts in the Gallery at Cooperstown: Sixteen Little-Known Members of the Hall of Fame (Jefferson, N.C.: McFarland). 
Forker, Dom, Robert Obojski, and Wayne Stewart (2004). The Big Book of Baseball Brainteasers (Sterling). 
Gallagher, Mark (2003). The Yankee Encyclopedia, 6th ed. (Champaign, Ill.: Sports Publishing LLC). 
Hanlon, John (1968). "First Perfect Game In the Major Leagues", Sports Illustrated (August 26; available online).
Holtzman, Jerome (2003). "Pitching Perfection Is in the Eye of the Beholder", Baseball Digest (June; available online).
James, Bill. The New Bill James Historical Baseball Abstract, rev. ed. (Simon and Schuster, 2003). 
Kennedy, Kostya (1996). "His Memory Is Perfect", Sports Illustrated (October 14; available online)
Lewis, Allen (2002). "Tainted No-hitters", Baseball Digest (February; available online).
Lupica, Mike (1999). Summer of '98: When Homers Flew, Records Fell, and Baseball Reclaimed America (New York: G.P. Putnam's Sons). 
McNeil, William F. (2003). The Dodgers Encyclopedia, 2d ed. (Champaign, Ill.: Sports Publishing LLC). 
Nemec, David (2006 [1994]). The Official Rules of Baseball Illustrated (Guilford, Conn.: Globe Pequot). 
Newman, Bruce (1981). "Perfect in Every Way", Sports Illustrated (May 25; available online).
Nowlin, Bill (2005). "Rick Wise", in '75: The Red Sox Team That Saved Baseball, ed. Bill Nowlin and Cecilia Tan (Cambridge, Massachusetts: Rounder). 
Okrent, Daniel, and Steve Wulf (1989). Baseball Anecdotes (New York and Oxford: Oxford University Press). 
Reisler, Jim (2007). The Best Game Ever: Pirates vs. Yankees, October 13, 1960 (New York: Carroll & Graf). 
Robbins, Mike (2004). Ninety Feet from Fame: Close Calls with Baseball Immortality (New York: Carroll & Graf). 
Schneider, Russell (2005). The Cleveland Indians Encyclopedia, 3d ed. (Champaign, Ill.: Sports Publishing LLC). 
Schott, Tom, and Nick Peters (2003). The Giants Encyclopedia (Champaign, Ill.: Sports Publishing LLC). 
Simon, Thomas P., ed. (2004). Deadball Stars of the National League (Brassey's). 
Sullivan, Dean, ed. (2002). Late Innings: A Documentary History of Baseball, 1945–1972 (Lincoln: University of Nebraska Press). 
Thielman, Jim (2005). Cool of the Evening: The 1965 Minnesota Twins (Minneapolis, Minn.: Kirk House Publishers). 
Vass, George (1998). "Here Are the 13 Most Fascinating No-Hitters", Baseball Digest (June).
Vass, George (2002). "Seven Most Improbable No-Hitters", Baseball Digest (August; available online).
Vass, George (2007). "One Out Away from Fame: The Final Out of Hitless Games Has Often Proved to Be a Pitcher's Toughest Conquest", Baseball Digest (June; available online).
Westcott, Rich (2005). Veterans Stadium: Field of Memories (Philadelphia: Temple University Press). 
Young, Mark C. (1997). The Guinness Book of Sports Records (Guinness Media). 
Zingg, Paul J., and Mark D. Medeiros (1994). Runs, Hits, and an Era: the Pacific Coast League, 1903–58 (Champaign: University of Illinois Press).

External links
 Perfect Games Baseball Almanac links to boxscores of both official and unofficial games
 Pitchers who retired 27 consecutive batters or more over a span of two or more games Baseball Prospectus article by Keith Woolner on "hidden" perfect games (also see the follow-up)
 Rare Feats: Perfect Games MLB.com links to historical video and audio extracts

 
Pitching statistics
Baseball terminology
Perfect scores in sports